Elena Scovitina-Miskova (born  in Bender, Moldavian SSR) is a Moldavian draughts player in Brazilian and Russian draughts, world champion in 2005, 2006 and 2015 and European champion in 2004 and 2008, Many times champion of Moldova, international grandmaster since 2005.

Elena Miskova also played in international draughts — in 2002 she won European Youth Championship Girls – 16, in 2005 was third in Junior World Championship.

Results in World Championship and European Championship in draughts-64

 After preliminary

External links 
WMSG Russian Draughts 8x8 women 2008. Swiss sistem
WMSG Russian Draughts 8x8 women Play Offs 2008

References 

Moldovan draughts players
Soviet draughts players
Players of Brazilian draughts
Players of Russian draughts
1986 births
Living people